In 1938, Henry Murray  developed a system of needs as part of his theory of personality, which he named personology. He argued that everyone had a set of universal basic needs, with individual differences on these needs leading to the uniqueness of personality through varying dispositional tendencies for each need; in other words, specific needs are more important to some than to others. In his theory, Murray argues that needs and presses (another component of the theory) acted together to create an internal state of disequilibrium; the individual is then driven to engage in some sort of behavior to reduce the tension. Murray believed that the study of personality should look at the entire person over the course of their lifespan – that people needed to be analysed in terms of complex interactions and whole systems rather than individual parts – and an individual's behaviors, needs and their levels, etc. are all part of that understanding. Murray also argued that there was a biological (specifically neurological) basis for personality and behavior.

Needs 

Murray defines a need as a drive that has the potential to prompt a behavior from the person. For example, the need for affiliation may drive a person to join social organization. Needs are often influenced by environmental stimulus or "presses", another component of Murray's theory.

Individual differences in levels of needs lead to the uniqueness of a person's personality; in other words, specific needs may be more important to some than to others. According to Murray, human needs are psychogenic in origin, function on an unconscious level, and can play a major role in defining personality. Frustration of these psychogenic needs plays a central role in the origin of psychological pain. He also believed that these needs could be measured by projective tests, specifically one he had developed, known as the thematic apperception test (TAT). Unlike Maslow's hierarchy of needs, Murray's needs are not based on a hierarchy; individuals may be high in one and low in the other, and multiple needs may be affected by a single action.

Murray differentiated each need as unique, but recognized commonalities among them, codified at least partially in his categorization system. Behaviors may meet more than one need:  for instance, performing a difficult task for your fraternity may meet the needs of both achievement and affiliation. While each need is important in and of itself, he also believed that needs can support or conflict with one another, and can be interrelated. He coined the term "subsidation of needs" to describe when two or more needs are combined in order to satisfy a more powerful need, and the term "fusion of needs" to describe when a single action satisfies more than one need. For example, the need for dominance may conflict the need with affiliation when overly controlling behavior drives away family, romantic partners, and friends. A need may be a purely internal state, but more often it is evoked by a press.

Presses 

Murray argued environmental factors play a role in how psychogenic needs are displayed in behavior. He used the term "presses" to describe external influences on motivation that may influence an individual's level of a need as well as their subsequent behavior. The "press" of an object is what it can do for or to the subject.

Any stimulus with the potential to affect the individual in a positive or negative way is referred to as "pressive", and everything else is referred to as inert. "Pressive Perception" is how the subject interprets a press as either a positive or negative stimulus. "Pressive Apperception" refers to the subjects anticipation that the stimulus will be perceived as either positive or negative. Murray notes that both Pressive Perception and Apperception are largely unconscious. Presses may have positive or negative effects, may be mobile (affecting the subject if they do nothing) or immobile (affecting the subject if they take an action), and may be an alpha press (real effects) or a beta press (merely perceived).

Needs by category 
Murray divides needs into several binary categories: manifest (overt) or latent (covert), conscious or unconscious, and primary (viscerogenic) and secondary (psychogenic) needs. Manifest needs are those that are allowed to be directly expressed, while latent needs are not outwardly acted on. Conscious needs as those that a subject can self-report, while unconscious needs are all others. This is distinct from manifest versus latent in that a person may directly express a need they are unaware of, or not express a need they are aware of. The categorization most commonly referred to is the division between primary (viscerogenic) and secondary (psychogenic) needs.

Primary/viscerogenic needs 
Primary needs are defined by Murray as needs involving some biological process and arise in response to certain stimuli or events that drive the body towards a certain outcome ('positive' or 'negative').For example, dehydration would trigger a "need for water", which in turn drives a person to seek out and intake water. The first six primary needs (air, water, food, sentience, sex, and lactation) are considered "positive" needs, as they drive a person towards a certain object or action. The remaining seven (expiration, urination, defecation, and the four avoidance needs) are considered to be "negative" needs as they drive a person away from an object (or in some cases towards the expulsion of an object).

Secondary/psychogenic needs 
Secondary needs emerge from or are influenced by primary needs. Murray identified 17 secondary needs, each belonging to one of eight need domains: ambition, materialism, status, power, sadomasochism, social-conformance, affection, and information. Needs in each domain have similar themes underpinning them; for instance, the ambition domain contains all those needs which relate to achievement and recognition.

Applications

Personality testing

Murray's system of needs has influenced the creation of personality testing, including both objective and subjective measures. A personality test is a questionnaire or other standardized instrument designed to reveal aspects of an individual's character or psychological makeup. Murray's system of needs directly influenced the development of a variety of personality measures, including the Personality Research Form and the Jackson Personality Inventory.

Thematic apperception test

Henry Murray, along with Christiana Morgan, developed the thematic apperception test (TAT) as a tool to assess personality. The TAT is based on the assumption that human unconscious needs are directed towards an external stimulus. Murray and Morgan created the TAT to evaluate "press" and "need", which Murray emphasized in his theory of personality. The TAT is administered  by an  assessor, who chooses a subset of cards (generally concerning a particular theme, or those that they feel best suit the subject) out of the 32 available; Murray recommended selecting 20. Each card features various ambiguous scenes which relate to interpersonal situations. The test-taker is asked to give a detailed explanation of what they see. For example, an explanation may include a narrative of what is happening and what may unfold, and what the characters in the scene are feeling or thinking. From this narrative, the assessor uses Murray's theoretical themes to infer personality characteristics.

Further research

Murray's theory of personality was the basis for several areas of further psychological research. Three of the needs he identified–the need for power, the need for affiliation, and the need for achievement–were later the subject of substantial study and considered especially significant; used to develop theories such as Maslow's hierarchy of needs, David McClelland's "Achievement Motivation Theory", aspects of Richard Boyatzis' competency-based models of management effectiveness, and more.

Murray's concept of the "press" and his emphasis on the importance of environmental events (and their subjective interpretation) were also highly significant to later psychological research. Behavioral psychology-pioneered by John B. Watson and B. F. Skinner-focused on environmental events, while cognitive psychology included a focus on subjective interpretation of events, based on another one of Murray's ideas (his categorization of presses as either Alpha or Beta).

Criticisms 

Although Murray's theory has had a substantial influence on personality testing and research, some critics say that his system of needs is too broad and rather subjective. One criticism of this hierarchy is that it lacks the objective criterion for needs. It can also be said that some of the needs can conflict with each other like achievement and nurturance, which deal with opposing ideas of having to obstacles with achievement being active and nurturance being passive.  This could possibly be due to contrasting instructions from the experimenters.

See also
Maslow's hierarchy of needs

References

Further reading
 Murray, H. A. (1938). Explorations in personality. New York: Oxford University Press

External links
 http://allpsych.com/personalitysynopsis/murray.html

Personality
Human development
Interpersonal relationships
Personal development
Personal life
Developmental psychology
Motivational theories
Happiness